A court-martial is a military court that determines punishments for members of the military subject to military law.

Court Martial may also refer to:

 Drumhead court-martial,  a trial held in the field to hear urgent charges.
 Court Martial (horse), a British Thoroughbred racehorse
 "Court Martial" (Star Trek: The Original Series), an episode of Star Trek: The Original Series
 Court Martial (TV series), an ITC Entertainment and Roncom Productions co-production crime drama TV series that premiered in 1966
 Court Martial (1928 film), a 1928 film directed by George B. Seitz
 Court Martial (1959 film), a 1959 German film
 Court Martial (1978 film), a 1978 Yugoslav film
 Court Martial (2020 film), a 2020 Indian film
 Court Martial (play), a play written by Swadesh Deepak and directed by Arvind Gaur

See also
 Marshal of the Court (disambiguation)